The Jadu (더 자두) was a South Korean modern rock band that performed from 2001 to 2008.  "Jadu" means "Plum" in Korean.  In 2000, Korea Now called The Jadu one of Korea's "most celebrated indie bands."

The band formed  in 2001, initially comprising lead Jadu (자두) (real name Kim Deok Eun; 김덕은) and Kang Doo (강두) (real name Song Yong Shik; 송용식).  Kang left the band in 2006 to pursue an acting career, and was replaced by Maru (마루).

Awards
The Jadu won a Seoul Music Award for Best Newcomer in 2001; and the Mnet Asian Music Award for Best Coed Group in 2002.

Discography
 Version 0001, released 2001-03-22
 Change Yourself, released 2002-04-02
 Jadu 3, released 2003-05-15
 Jadu 4, released 2005-05-03
 Happy Network, released 2008-04-24

Awards

Mnet Asian Music Awards

References

External links
The Jadu at Yahoo Music
The Jadu at ManiaDB

South Korean pop rock music groups
South Korean co-ed groups
Musical groups established in 2001
MAMA Award winners